Serbia and Montenegro men's national tennis team represented Serbia and Montenegro in international tennis competitions in 2004–2006.

References

External links

Davis
δ Yugoslavia
T